The Kaskelen gorge or Kaskelenskoye gorge is the gorge of the Kaskelen river, a protected natural monument in the mountains of the Ile-Alatau National Park, Kazakhstan.

Description
The most powerful movement of the mountain-forming processes in this area was marked at the beginning of the anthropogenic period (about a million years ago). At this time, the formation of the contours of the Trans-ili Alatau continued, and the Kaskelen gorge in Kazakhstan was created.

Flora
On both sides of the road there are gardens.  The floodplain often contains elm trees, single poplars and occasional wild apple, apricot, and maple Semyonov.
Birch groves stretch for hundreds of hectares. There is also a profusion of young spruce trees. Throughout the Tien Shan spruce undergrowth is very rare, but in the Kaskelen gorge it is dense and abundant. There are also young spruce trees of 30–50 years of age. Kaskelen gorge is rocky with shallow soil.  Spruce is renewed and grows on shallow stony soils.  The conditions for competing vegetation are less favorable.

Tourism
The attraction of the Kaskelen gorge is a large stone yurt, in Kazakh Uy-tas, which is located on the very crest of the side ridge, above the nursery, South-East of the road. The height of the stone Yurt is about 5 meters, the diameter is 6 meters, and the weight is more than 500 tons.

Relief
Beyond the Kaskelen gorge, the Trans-ili Alatau continues West for another hundred kilometers, but the mountains become lower and the climate drier. There are no forests, no eternal snows, no glaciers. It has a typical semi-desert landscape of foothills and meadow steppe grassland.

Protection of the monument
The natural monument is included in a protected natural area with the status of a nature conservative and a scientific institution. Protection of the monument is assigned to the administration of the Ile-Alatau National Park. It has a favorable acoustic environment (silence, melodic sounds in nature). Recommended visiting periods: year round, day or night

Sources 
 M. Zh. Zhandaev Nature Of The TRANS-Ili Alatau. ed. «Kazakhstan».- Alma-ATA, 1978
 V. N. Vukolov On the Northern Tien Shan. Ed. "Profizdat" M:, 1991
 A. P. Gorbunov Mountains Of Central Asia. Explanatory dictionary of geographical names and terms. Almaty, 2006

External links 
 Ile-Alatau state national park
 UNESCO World Heritage Convention: Northern Tyan-Shan (Ile-Alatau State National Park)

Geography of Kazakhstan